Georgi Yanev (born 4 January 1998) is a Bulgarian footballer who currently plays as a midfielder for Bulgarian Second League club Strumska Slava.

Career
After initially joining the academy system at Septemvri Sofia Yanev moved to the Levski Sofia academy at the age of 9.

On 1 August 2015, Yanev made his first senior appearance for Levski, replacing Jeremy de Nooijer for the last four minutes as Levski lost 0–2 at away against Ludogorets Razgrad in the A Group.

In January 2017, Yanev was loaned to Second League club Spartak Pleven until the end of the season.

On 24 August 2017, Yanev was sent on a season-long loan to newly promoted to Second League Strumska Slava Radomir.

International career

Youth levels
Yanev was called up for the Bulgaria U19 team for the 2017 European Under-19 Championship qualification from 22 to 27 March 2017. After a draw and 2 wins the team qualified for the knockout phase which will be held in July 2017.

Statistics
As of 1 August 2015

References

External links
 
 Profile at Levskisofia.info

1998 births
Living people
Footballers from Sofia
Bulgarian footballers
Bulgaria youth international footballers
First Professional Football League (Bulgaria) players
Second Professional Football League (Bulgaria) players
PFC Levski Sofia players
PFC Spartak Pleven players
FC Strumska Slava Radomir players
FC Lokomotiv Gorna Oryahovitsa players
FC Botev Vratsa players
FC Sportist Svoge players
Association football midfielders